Kilminster may refer to:

People
 Dave Kilminster, a British guitarist who toured with Keith Emerson and Roger Waters
 For Ian Fraiser Kilmister, known as "Lemmy", an English musician and founder of heavy metal band Motorhead, see Lemmy Kilmister.